The Ministry of Labor and Promotion of Employment of Peru is the public institution responsible for matters of labor and promotion of employment. It develops the implementation of policies and programs to improve employment generation and seeks to aid microbusinesses and small businesses.

Other functions of the Ministry include the promotion of social welfare and vocational training, as well as ensurance of compliance with legal standards and working conditions, in a context of dialogue and consultation between social partners and the state. , the minister of labor is Alejandro Salas.

References
Official Page Of The Ministry Of Labor And Promotion of Employment of Peru

Labor and Promotion of Employment
Peru